The 1932 Tipperary Senior Hurling Championship was the 41st staging of the Tipperary Senior Hurling Championship since its establishment by the Tipperary County Board in 1887.

Moycarkey-Borris won the championship after a 7–06 to 5–01 win over Killenaule in the final. It was the club's second title as Moycarkey-Borris but the sixth title to be claimed by a team representing the area.

References

Tipperary
Tipperary Senior Hurling Championship